Brian Oliván Herrero (born 1 April 1994) is a Spanish professional footballer who plays for RCD Espanyol as a left back.

Club career
Born in Barcelona, Catalonia, Oliván graduated with FC Barcelona's youth ranks. In August 2013, before even appearing as a senior he moved abroad, signing a three-year deal with Portuguese side S.C. Braga and being assigned to the reserves in Segunda Liga.

Oliván played his first match as a professional on 14 September 2013, coming on as a second-half substitute in a 1–0 away loss against C.D. Feirense. He rescinded his link with the club in January of the following year, and subsequently joined PFC CSKA Sofia in the following month.

On 21 July 2014, after failing to make any appearances with CSKA, Oliván joined another reserve team, Real Valladolid B in Segunda División B. On 18 December he first appeared with the main squad, starting in a 1–0 Copa del Rey away loss against Elche CF.

On 2 July 2015 Oliván signed a three-year deal with Granada CF, being assigned to the B-team also in the third division. On 23 August of the following year, he was loaned to Cádiz CF in the second tier, for one year.

After being an undisputed starter, Oliván was bought outright on 19 June 2017, and signed a contract until 2021. On 2 September 2019, he was loaned to fellow second division side Girona FC for the season.

On 9 September 2020, Oliván joined RCD Mallorca on a two-year deal. He helped the club in their promotion to La Liga in his first season, and made his top tier debut on 14 August 2021, starting and netting the opener in a 1–1 home draw against Real Betis.

On 21 June 2022, free agent Oliván moved to RCD Espanyol also in the main category, after agreeing to a three-year contract.

Career statistics

Club

References

External links
Profile at the RCD Espanyol website

1994 births
Living people
Footballers from Barcelona
Spanish footballers
Association football fullbacks
Spain youth international footballers
La Liga players
Segunda División players
Segunda División B players
Real Valladolid Promesas players
Real Valladolid players
Club Recreativo Granada players
Cádiz CF players
Girona FC players
RCD Mallorca players
RCD Espanyol footballers
Liga Portugal 2 players
S.C. Braga B players
PFC CSKA Sofia players
Spanish expatriate footballers
Spanish expatriate sportspeople in Portugal
Spanish expatriate sportspeople in Bulgaria
Expatriate footballers in Portugal
Expatriate footballers in Bulgaria
Catalonia international footballers